Places & Spaces: Mapping Science is an internationally recognised science exhibition that demonstrates the power of maps to analyse, organize, and visualize abstract intellectual spaces. The exhibit showcases high-resolution maps that represent complex data in a visually understandable format. The maps featured in Places & Spaces were created by a global collection of experts in the fields of scientometrics, the natural, physical, and social sciences, visual arts, socio-political policymaking, and the humanities. By the end of 2014, the exhibit had collected 100 maps and various additional elements. The latter include Ingo Günther's Worldprocessor Globes, an illuminated diagram display, the Gapminder Card Game, hands-on science maps for kids, and the award-winning short film Humanexus.

Each year, the exhibition's international advisory board hosts a competitive selection process to choose ten new maps focused around a central theme. Past themes have included:

1st Iteration (2005): The Power of Maps

2nd Iteration (2006): The Power of Reference Systems

3rd Iteration (2007): The Power of Forecasts

4th Iteration (2008): Science Maps for Economic Decision Makers

5th Iteration (2009): Science Maps for Science Policy Makers

6th Iteration (2010): Science Maps for Scholars

7th Iteration (2011): Science Maps as Visual Interfaces to Digital Libraries

8th Iteration (2012): Science Maps for Kids

9th Iteration (2013): Science Maps Showing Trends and Dynamics

10th Iteration (2014): The Future of Science Mapping

History 
The exhibit was envisioned by Katy Börner, Sarah I. Fabrikant, Deborah MacPerson and André Skupin in January 2005, and it debuted at the Annual Meeting of the Association of American Geographers in April of that year. Since then, the exhibition has been displayed at more than 220 venues in 22 countries, including 15 in Europe, as well as Japan, China, Brazil, South Africa, Australia, Canada, and the United States. Places & Spaces functions as an outreach component of the Cyberinfrastructure for Network Science Center, which is housed at the School of Informatics and Computing at Indiana University.

Cartography
Science exhibitions
Indiana University